Waldo Machado da Silva (9 September 1934 – 25 February 2019), known simply as Waldo, was a Brazilian footballer who played as a forward.

He was best known for his time at Fluminense, where he was the top scorer in the club's history with 319 goals in 403 matches, and Valencia.

Club career
Waldo was born in Niterói, Rio de Janeiro. After joining Madureira Esporte Clube's youth setup in the early 1950s, he made his debut as a senior in 1953.

On 11 April 1954, Waldo signed for Fluminense FC, and was the top goalscorer of all tournaments which his team won. In the 1957 edition of the Torneio Rio – São Paulo, he was one of the most important players as Flu were crowned champions without losing a game.

Waldo left Fluminense on 1 July 1961 with a record of 319 goals in only 403 matches, the club's top goalscorer of all time. He immediately moved to La Liga's Valencia CF, signing as a replacement for his compatriot Walter Marciano who had just died at the age of 29 in a car accident after a friendly between the two sides.

Waldo made his debut in the Spanish top division on 3 September 1961, in a 3–0 away loss against Real Zaragoza. He scored his first two goals for the club six days later, in a 3–0 home win over Real Oviedo.

On 19 November 1961, Waldo scored four times in a 6–2 home rout of FC Barcelona, and finished his first season abroad with 14 goals from 30 appearances. On 12 June 1963, he equalised as Valencia came from behind to win 2–1 at GNK Dinamo Zagreb in the first leg of the Fairs Cup Final (4–1 on aggregate).

Waldo netted a career-best 24 league goals in the 1966–67 campaign, and started in the 2–1 Spanish Cup Final victory against Athletic Bilbao on 2 July 1967. He represented the Che until 1970, scoring 157 goals in 294 competitive matches.

In summer 1970, Waldo joined Valencian Community neighbours Hércules CF, retiring after one season in the Segunda División at the age of 36.

International career
Waldo earned five caps for Brazil and scored two goals, being a part of the squad which won the 1960 Taça do Atlântico.

International goals
Scores and results lists Brazil's goal tally first.

Personal life
Waldo's younger brother, Wanderley, was also a footballer and a forward. He spent most of his career with Levante UD and CD Málaga, and the pair were teammates at Hércules.

Death
On 25 February 2019, after five years battling with Alzheimer's disease, Waldo died in Burjassot at the age of 84.

Honours

Club
Fluminense
Campeonato Carioca: 1959
Torneio Rio-São Paulo: 1957, 1960

Valencia
Inter-Cities Fairs Cup: 1961–62, 1962–63
Copa del Generalísimo: 1966–67

International
Brazil
Taça do Atlântico: 1960

Individual
Pichichi Trophy: 1966–67

References

External links

CiberChe stats and bio 

1934 births
2019 deaths
Sportspeople from Niterói
Brazilian footballers
Association football forwards
Campeonato Brasileiro Série A players
Madureira Esporte Clube players
Fluminense FC players
La Liga players
Segunda División players
Valencia CF players
Hércules CF players
Brazil international footballers
Brazilian expatriate footballers
Expatriate footballers in Spain
Brazilian expatriate sportspeople in Spain
Pichichi Trophy winners
Brazilian football managers
Segunda División managers
Segunda División B managers
Brazilian expatriate football managers
Expatriate football managers in Spain
Deaths from dementia in Spain
Deaths from Alzheimer's disease